Tullylease Church is a medieval church and National Monument located in County Cork, Ireland.

The church is located 4.4 km (2.3 mi) southwest of Dromcolliher.

History
A monastery was founded here by the English exile St Berechert in the 7th century. Subsequently, in the 12th century, it housed an Augustinian monastery. The name is Irish for "uncovered hillock."

It was mentioned at the 1111 Synod of Ráth Breasail which established the diocese boundaries of Munster.

The present ruins date from various periods. Part of the east wall is from the 12th century, while the chancel dates back to the 15th century. There is also an 8th-century inscribed cross slab, dedicated to St Berechert.

Church

Beretchert’s eighth-century inscribed cross slab gravestone there reads , "whoever reads this please pray for Berechert". The incised cross is remarkably similar to an illustration in the Book of Lindisfarne. The Ardagh Chalice, discovered just fifteen miles northwest of Tullylease, also shares Lindisfarne stylization.

References

Religion in County Cork
Archaeological sites in County Cork
National Monuments in County Cork
Former churches in the Republic of Ireland